The Minnesota Justice Foundation (MJF) is a nonprofit organization that links Minnesotans who need legal aid with volunteer law students and attorneys. It was founded in 1982.

MJF does not provide direct legal assistance.

References

External links

Legal aid in the United States
Organizations established in 1982
1982 establishments in Minnesota

Non-profit organizations based in Minnesota